Xueyuan Road is a metro station on Line 2 and Line 10 of the Hangzhou Metro in China. It is located in the Xihu District of Hangzhou.

References

Railway stations in Zhejiang
Railway stations in China opened in 2017
Hangzhou Metro stations